Gianantonio Davia (13 October 1660 – 11 January 1740) was an Italian prelate of the Catholic Church, who served as an apostolic nuncio, Bishop/Archbishop, cardinal, and secretary of a major department (congregration) of the Roman Curia.

Biography
Davia was born in Bologna to a prominent family, whose name is also spelled as D'Avia and De Via. He was educated in both canon and civil law at the University of Bologna, and early in life, served as a magistrate and a soldier in the war between Venice and the Ottomans in 1684, where he took part in the siege of Santa Maura. He then moved to Rome, where he rose rapidly in the ecclesiastical ranks, despite never attending seminary. He served as nuncio in Cologne, Poland, and ultimately Austria by 1700, only to be expelled from Vienna after the death of Emperor Leopold I by his successor, Emperor Joseph I, in May 1706. On May 18, 1712; he was named a cardinal. He participated in the conclaves of 1721, 1724, and 1730.

In 1727, he was named Protector of Scotland, and minister of England to the exiled of Stuart pretender in Rome in April 1728. He was accused of supporting Jansenism on several occasions. He died in Rome and was buried at San Lorenzo in Lucina.

Cardinal Davia was particularly interested in scientific research. He had studied with Marcello Malpighi and Geminiano Montanari during his student days in Bologna. He participated in the lively scientific discussions of Montanari's Accademia della Traccia, continuing the academy in his own home when Montanari left Bologna. In 1681 he visited the Royal Society and the French Academy of Sciences. In 1725 Cardinal Davia donated to the Academy of Sciences of the Institute of Bologna a pendulum regulator of fine quality, a Newtonian reflecting telescope, and a quadrant.

References

Further reading

External links 
 

1660 births
1740 deaths
Clergy from Bologna
17th-century Italian cardinals